Peggy Waleska (born 11 April 1980) is a German rower.

Waleska was born in 1980 in Pirna, a town in Saxony. She is a world champion rower who won a gold medal in the women's quadruple sculls in Lucerne, Switzerland, in 2001 and successfully defended the title in Seville, Spain, in 2002. At the 2004 Athens Summer Olympics, Waleska won a silver medal in the women's double sculls event.

References

External links
 
 International Regatta Ratzeburg 

1980 births
Living people
People from Pirna
People from Bezirk Dresden
German female rowers
Sportspeople from Saxony
Olympic rowers of Germany
Rowers at the 2004 Summer Olympics
Olympic silver medalists for Germany
Olympic medalists in rowing
World Rowing Championships medalists for Germany
Medalists at the 2004 Summer Olympics
20th-century German women
21st-century German women